George Cressman (Oct. 7, 1919 – April 17, 2008) was the National Weather Service director who applied computers to meteorology and helped to change weather forecasting into a codified science. In the 1950s, Dr. Cressman was responsible for developing the first program to accurately and reliably forecast the weather using a computer. The method was called the “Cressman Analysis” or “Cressman Method” and changed forecasting methods and allowed meteorologists to develop numerical weather prediction. He was the director of the Weather Service from 1965 to 1979.

References

1919 births
2008 deaths
American meteorologists
National Weather Service